Zotto (also Zotton or Zottone) was the military leader of the Lombards in the Mezzogiorno. He is generally considered the founder of the Duchy of Benevento in 571 and its first duke : “…Fuit autem primus Langobardorum dux in Benevento nomine Zotto, qui in ea principatus est per curricula viginti annorum…” (Pauli Diaconi Historiae Langobardorum - Liber Tertius). 

With his troops, he penetrated Campania in August 570, confronting the Byzantines, whom he defeated consistently.  He fixed his camp in Benevento, which became the capital of the new duchy. He tried to take Naples, but failed and had to lift the siege (581). 

As a duke he was quasi-independent, the north of the peninsula being under the control of the Lombard king Authari, who had little influence in the south. He finally submitted to royal authority in 589. 

He died in 591 and was succeeded by Arechis.

References

External links 
  Ducato (570 ca.-774) et Principato di Benevento (774-1077)
  I Longobardi del Sud

591 deaths
Dukes of Benevento
Lombard warriors
6th-century Lombard people
6th-century rulers in Europe
Year of birth unknown